The UK Singles Chart is one of many music charts compiled by the Official Charts Company that calculates the best-selling singles of the week in the United Kingdom. Before 2004, the chart was only based on the sales of physical singles. This list shows singles that peaked in the Top 10 of the UK Singles Chart during 1971, as well as singles which peaked in 1970 and 1972 but were in the top 10 in 1971. The entry date is when the single appeared in the top 10 for the first time (week ending, as published by the Official Charts Company, which is six days after the chart is announced).

One-hundred and six singles were in the top ten in 1971. Ten singles from 1970 remained in the top 10 for several weeks at the beginning of the year, while "Something Tells Me (Something's Gonna Happen Tonight)" by Cilla Black was released in 1971 but did not reach its peak until 1972. "Grandad" by Clive Dunn, "I'll Be There" by The Jackson 5 and "Ride a White Swan" by T. Rex were the singles from 1970 to reach their peak in 1971. Sixteen artists scored multiple entries in the top 10 in 1971. Bay City Rollers, Elton John, The New Seekers, Rod Stewart and Slade were among the many artists who achieved their first UK charting top 10 single in 1971.

The 1970 Christmas number-one, "I Hear You Knocking" by Dave Edmunds, remained at number-one for the first week of 1971. The first new number-one single of the year was "Grandad" by Clive Dunn. Overall, thirteen different singles peaked at number-one in 1971, with T. Rex (2) having the most singles hit that position.

Background

Multiple entries
One-hundred and six singles charted in the top 10 in 1971, with one-hundred and two singles reaching their peak this year.

Seventeen artists scored multiple entries in the top 10 in 1971. Elvis Presley and T. Rex shared the record for most top 10 hits in 1971 with four hit singles each.

George Harrison was one of a number of artists with two top-ten entries, including the number-one single "My Sweet Lord". Andy Williams, Dave and Ansell Collins, Gilbert O'Sullivan, Mungo Jerry and The Supremes were among the other artists who had multiple top 10 entries in 1971.

Chart debuts
Forty-three artists achieved their first top 10 single in 1971, either as a lead or featured artist. Of these, five went on to record another hit single that year: C.C.S., Dave and Ansell Collins, John Kongos, Middle of the Road and Olivia Newton-John. Dawn had two other entries in their breakthrough year.

The following table (collapsed on desktop site) does not include acts who had previously charted as part of a group and secured their first top 10 solo single.

Notes
George Harrison started his post-Beatles career with his debut solo single in 1971, "My Sweet Lord", topping the chart. A second single, "Bangla-Desh", also charted at number 10 this year. Fellow bandmate Paul McCartney also began life away from The Beatles with his first solo top 10 hit, "Another Day", which reached number two. With John Lennon having charted with Plastic Ono Band and a debut solo single the previous year, Ringo Starr became the final member to go it alone in 1971. His first release was the number 4 hit "It Don't Come Easy".

Before finding success as lead singer with Dawn, Tony Orlando had achieved a solo UK top 10 entry in 1961 with "Bless You", which reached number 5.

Songs from films
Original songs from various films entered the top 10 throughout the year. These included "(Where Do I Begin?) Love Story" (from Love Story) and "Theme from "Shaft"" (Shaft).

Charity singles
George Harrison released the single "Bangla Desh" as a follow-up to debut solo single "My Sweet Lord". The single highlighted the plight of refugees in Bangladesh (previously known as East Pakistan) after the country was hit by the 1970 Bhola cyclone. The song was performed by Harrison at The Concert for Bangladesh, a benefit concert to aid victims and survivors. The single charted in the UK at number ten on 28 August 1971.

Best-selling singles
George Harrison had the best-selling single of the year with "My Sweet Lord". The single spent ten weeks in the top 10 (including five weeks at number one), sold over 890,000 copies and was certified silver by the BPI. "Maggie May"/"Reason to Believe" by Rod Stewart came in second place, selling more than 615,000 copies and losing out by around 275,000 sales. Middle of the Road's "Chirpy Chirpy Cheep Cheep", "Knock Three Times" from Dawn featuring Tony Orlando and "Hot Love" by T. Rex made up the top five. Singles by The Mixtures, The New Seekers, Diana Ross, The Tams and T. Rex ("Get It On") were also in the top ten best-selling singles of the year.

Top-ten singles
Key

Entries by artist

The following table shows artists who achieved two or more top 10 entries in 1971, including singles that reached their peak in 1970. The figures include both main artists and featured artists, while appearances on ensemble charity records are also counted for each artist. The total number of weeks an artist spent in the top ten in 1971 is also shown.

Notes

 "Cracklin' Rosie" re-entered the top 10 at number 10 on 30 January 1971 (week ending).
 "Ride a White Swan" re-entered the top 10 at number 10 on 2 January 1971 (week ending) for 6 weeks.
 "Amazing Grace" re-entered the top 10 at number 6 on 27 March 1971 (week ending).
 "Resurrection Shuffle" re-entered the top 10 at number 10 on 20 March 1971 (week ending).
 "Jack in the Box" was the United Kingdom's entry at the Eurovision Song Contest in 1971.
 "Something Old, Something New" re-entered the top 10 at number 9 on 8 May 1971 (week ending).
 "Un banc, un arbre, une rue" was Monaco's winning entry at the Eurovision Song Contest in 1971.
 "Just My Imagination (Running Away with Me)" re-entered the top 10 at number 10 on 24 July 1971 (week ending).
 Both "Heartbreak Hotel" and "Hound Dog" made the UK Singles Chart as separate entries when initially released in 1956. Both singles peaked at number two. The two songs were re-issued together as a double A-sided single in 1971. This re-release was part of an RCA Records series entitled "Maxi Million".
 "Bangla Desh" was released as a charity single to raise awareness of refugees in Bangladesh (formerly East Pakistan) following the 1970 Bhola cyclone, backed by a relief concert.
 Figure includes single that first charted in 1970 but peaked in 1971.
 Figure includes single that peaked in 1970.

See also
1971 in British music
List of number-one singles from the 1970s (UK)

References
General

Specific

External links
1971 singles chart archive at the Official Charts Company (click on relevant week)

United Kingdom
Top 10 singles
1971